Dicks Arm is a bay in Hoonah–Angoon Census Area, Alaska, in the United States. The inlet is located on Cross Sound.

It was named in 1901 by a member of the U.S. National Geodetic Survey.

References

Bays of Hoonah–Angoon Census Area, Alaska
Bays of Alaska